MGP Nordic (Melodi Grand Prix Nordic) was a Scandinavian song contest for children aged 8 to 15, organized by DR, NRK, SVT and Yle through Yle Fem. It originated as a 2000 spin-off of Denmark's Eurovision Song Contest national final known as De unges Melodi Grand Prix, but expanded to become MGP Nordic in 2002 with the addition of Norway and Sweden. The competing entries were sung primarily in the official or co-official languages of the corresponding countries and written solely by the participants.

History
MGP Nordic was put on hiatus in 2003 when the European Broadcasting Union began to organize the Junior Eurovision Song Contest, a pan-European expansion of the concept. Regional finalists were sent to the new competition instead of MGP Nordic until 2006, when the countries jointly pulled out of the contest due to concerns over the ethical treatment of competitors. As a result, MGP Nordic was revived in 2006, with the new addition of Finland to the competition a year later.

In 2010, the contest was supposed to have taken place in Oslo, Norway, but it was cancelled due to Denmark pulling out in order to revise the participant requirements for DR's participation in the contest. SVT has since begun competing in the Junior Eurovision Song Contest again for Sweden, returning in 2010. As a result, MGP Nordic was cancelled and has not returned since.

National selections

List of contests

Scoretable

See also 
 MGP Junior, Denmark's national MGP competition
 Melodi Grand Prix Junior, Norway's national MGP competition
 Lilla Melodifestivalen, Swedish national MGP competition
 Junior Eurovision Song Contest, a pan-European version of the concept

References

External links 
 The Official Norwegian MGP jr. site
 The Official Swedish MGP jr. site
 The Official Danish MGP jr. site
 The Official Finnish MGP jr. site

 
Singing talent shows
Song contests
Junior Eurovision Song Contest
Music competitions in Denmark
Music competitions in Finland
Music competitions in Norway
Music competitions in Sweden
2000 establishments in Denmark
2007 establishments in Finland
2002 establishments in Norway
2002 establishments in Sweden
Recurring events established in 2002
Recurring events disestablished in 2009